Williamodendron is a genus of evergreen trees belonging to the Laurel family, Lauraceae, in South America.

Description
Fruit is globose and subtended by the small persistent tepals, which form a collar at the base of the fruit. The floral characters and the wood and bark anatomy indicate a close relationship between Williamodendron and Mezilaurus.

Species
Species in the genus include the following:
 Williamodendron cinnamomeum 
 Williamodendron glaucophyllum (van der Werff) Kubitzki & H.G.Richt.	
 Williamodendron quadrilocellatum (van der Werff) Kubitzki & H.G. Richt.

References

Lauraceae genera
Neotropical realm flora
Lauraceae